Lissanthe is a genus  of shrubs in the family Ericaceae. The genus is endemic to Australia.

Species include:
Lissanthe brevistyla A.R.Bean 
Lissanthe pluriloculata (F.Muell.) J.M.Powell
Lissanthe powelliae Crayn & E.A.Br. 
Lissanthe rubicunda (F.Muell.) J.M.Powell
Lissanthe sapida R.Br.
Lissanthe scabra Crayn & E.A.Br.
Lissanthe strigosa (Sm.) R.Br.

References

Epacridoideae
Ericaceae genera
Ericales of Australia